The 1930 Paris–Tours was the 25th edition of the Paris–Tours cycle race and was held on 4 May 1930. The race started in Paris and finished in Tours. The race was won by Jean Maréchal.

General classification

References

1930 in French sport
1930
May 1930 sports events